Justin Simmons (born November 19, 1993) is an American football free safety for the Denver Broncos of the National Football League (NFL). He played college football at Boston College and was selected by the Broncos in the third round of the 2016 NFL Draft.

College career
Simmons attended Boston College where he enrolled as a communication major in the Morrissey College of Arts and Sciences. While at Boston College, he played both safety and cornerback.

In 2012, as a freshman he appeared in all 12 of the Eagles games. He started six games at free safety and one at cornerback. He finished seventh on the team with 52 tackles, he was tied for the team lead with two forced fumbles. In 2013, as a sophomore, he appeared in all 13 games, he recorded 34 tackles, 22 solo tackles, and three pass break-ups. In 2014, as a junior, he started all 13 games, the first seven at free safety and the final six at right cornerback, moving due to injuries on the team. For the season, he led the team with 76 tackles, 63 solo and two interceptions. He finished second on the team with five pass breakups. Before the 2015 season, he was awarded the Jay McGillis Memorial Scholarship Award. For the season, as a senior, he started all 12 games at free safety. He finished the season third on the team with 67 tackles, 49 solo. He was tied for 20th in the nation and second in the conference with five interceptions and tied for first in the conference with three fumble recoveries. He was named Second-team All-Atlantic Coast Conference (ACC) by the Atlantic Coast Sports Media Association and ACC head coaches. He was also named Second-team All-ACC by Phil Steele and the Associated Press. He was named to Steele's All-American Fourth Team and ProFootballFocus.com All-America honorable mention.

Professional career
Simmons attended the NFL Scouting Combine in Indianapolis and recorded the best 20-yard shuttle (3.85s) since 2006 (3.81s). He also tied Braxton Miller with the best 60-yard shuttle since 2014 (10.72) with a time of 10.84 seconds. He also had the best time in the 60-yard shuttle and was second overall in the three-cone drill. On March 16, 2016, Simmons participated at Boston College's pro day, but chose to stand on the majority of his combine numbers and only performed the 40-yard dash (4.53s), 20-yard dash (2.62s), and 10-yard dash (1.56s). 

Simmons performed at private workouts with Dallas Cowboys and New Orleans Saints and also attended pre-draft visits with the Pittsburgh Steelers and Detroit Lions. At the conclusion of the pre-draft process, Simmons was projected to be a third round pick by NFL draft experts and scouts. He was ranked as the fourth best free safety prospect in the draft by DraftScout.com and was ranked the sixth best safety by NFL analyst Mike Mayock and Scouts Inc.

The Denver Broncos selected Simmons in the third round (98th overall) of the 2016 NFL Draft. Simmons was the seventh safety drafted in 2016.

2016 season

On May 13, 2016, the Broncos signed Simmons to four-year, $3.06 million contract that includes a signing bonus of $645,420.

Simmons entered training camp slated as the primary backup safety. Head coach Gary Kubiak named Simmons the backup free safety to begin the regular season, behind Darian Stewart.

Simmons made his NFL debut in the Broncos' season-opener against the Carolina Panthers and recorded one tackle in the narrow 21–20 victory. Simmons was inactive for the Broncos' Week 3 victory at the Cincinnati Bengals due to a wrist injury. He was sidelined for two more games (Weeks 5–6) due to a small fracture in his wrist. In Week 8, Simmons recorded one tackle and made his first career sack as the Broncos defeated the San Diego Chargers 27–19. Simmons sacked Chargers’ quarterback Philip Rivers for a nine-yard loss during the fourth quarter. On November 13, 2016, Simmons leaped over the offensive line and blocked an extra point attempt by the New Orleans Saints' kicker Wil Lutz. The ball was recovered by Broncos teammate Will Parks and was returned for an 84-yard game-winning safety as the Broncos defeated the New Orleans Saints 25–23. On December 18, 2016, Simmons earned his first career start and recorded two solo tackles during a 16–3 loss against the New England Patriots in Week 15. On December 25, 2016, Simmons started in place of T. J. Ward who sustained a concussion the previous week. He collected a season-high five combined tackles, broke up two passes, and made his first career interception in the Broncos' 33–10 loss at the Kansas City Chiefs in Week 16. Simmons intercepted a pass by Chiefs’ quarterback Alex Smith, that was initially intended for wide receiver Tyreek Hill, and returned it for a 38-yard gain in the first quarter. Simmons finished his rookie season in 2016 with 30 combined tackles (25 solo), four pass deflections, two interceptions, and one sack in 13 games and three starts.

2017 season
On January 2, 2017, Broncos head coach Gary Kubiak announced his decision to retire due to health issues. On January 11, 2017, the Denver Broncos hired Miami Dolphins defensive coordinator Vance Joseph as their new head coach. Joseph hired Joe Woods to replace Wade Phillips as defensive coordinator. Simmons entered training camp slated as a backup safety but began competing against T.J. Ward to be the starting strong safety after impressing the coaching staff. Head coach Vance Joseph named Simmons the starting strong safety to begin the regular season and elected to release T. J. Ward as part of the Broncos’ final roster cuts.

During Week 6, Simmons collected a season-high 11 solo tackles and deflected two passes during a 23–10 loss against the New York Giants. On December 3, 2017, he made seven combined tackles, broke up a pass attempt, and returned an interception for the first touchdown of his career during a 35–9 loss at the Miami Dolphins in Week 13. Simmons intercepted a pass thrown by Dolphins’ quarterback Jay Cutler, that was intended for wide receiver DeVante Parker, and returned it for a 65-yard touchdown during the third quarter. In the next game, Simmons injured his ankle while celebrating a strip/sack with Brandon Marshall during a 23–0 victory against the New York Jets. On December 13, 2017, he was placed on injured reserve due to a sprained ankle.

Simmons finished the season with 68 combined tackles (49 solo), five passes defensed, two interceptions, one sack, and one touchdown in 13 games and 13 starts.

2018 season
Simmons entered training camp slated as the starting free safety after a promising 2017 season. Head coach Vance Joseph named Simmons and Darian Stewart the starting safeties to begin 2018. In Week 11, he collected a season-high ten combined tackles (five solo) and deflected a pass during a 23–22 win at the Los Angeles Chargers. On December 2, 2018, Simmons made nine combined tackles, broke up a pass, and made his third interception of the season during a 24–10 victory at the Cincinnati Bengals in Week 13.

Simmons started all 16 games in 2018 and recorded a career-high 97 combined tackles (71 solo), four pass deflections, and three interceptions while playing every single defensive snap for the first time in his career. On December 31, 2018, the Broncos announced their decision to fire head coach Vance Joseph after they finished with a 6–10 record. He received an overall grade of 60.8 from Pro Football Focus, which ranked 74th among all qualified safeties in 2018.

2019 season
In Week 5 against the Los Angeles Chargers, Simmons recorded his first interception of the season off of Philip Rivers in the 20-13 win. The following week, he recorded another interception off of Marcus Mariota as the Broncos beat the Tennessee Titans by a score of 16-0.

Following the 2019 regular season, PFF named Simmons as the highest-graded safety in the NFL with a grade of 90.8.   He played every single defensive snap for the second consecutive season and was elected as a second-team All-Pro at the conclusion of the 2019 season. The local media also voted him as the winner of the Darrent Williams Good Guy of the Year award and as a nominee for the Walter Payton Man of the Year Award. After a breakout 2019 season, Simmons was set to be an unrestricted free agent following the 2019 season after recording four interceptions to go along with 15 passes defended.

2020 season
The Broncos placed the franchise tag on him on March 13, 2020. He signed the one-year tender worth $11.441 million on July 14, 2020.

In Week 2 against the Pittsburgh Steelers, Simmons led the team with 8 tackles and recorded his first interception of the season off a pass thrown by Ben Roethlisberger during the 26–21 loss. In Week 11 against the Miami Dolphins, with the Dolphins driving and trailing 20–13, Simmons intercepted a pass thrown by quarterback Ryan Fitzpatrick in the end zone with 1:05 left, halting the Dolphins comeback attempt and sealing a Broncos victory.

On December 21, 2020, Simmons was voted to the 2021 Pro Bowl.
In Week 17 against the Las Vegas Raiders, Simmons recorded his career high fifth interception of the season off a pass thrown by Derek Carr during the 32–31 loss.

2021 season
On March 5, 2021, the Broncos placed the franchise tag on Simmons for a second consecutive season. He signed a four-year, $61 million contract extension with the team on March 19, 2021.

2022 season
In Week 1, Simmons suffered a quad injury and was placed on injured reserve on September 14, 2022. He was activated on October 17.

NFL career statistics

Personal life
Justin Simmons was born to Victor and Kimberly Simmons in 1993.  His father is black and his mother is white.  Simmons also has two younger brothers, Nate and Tristan.

Simmons married his high school sweetheart Taryn Richard in 2016. They have two daughters, Laney and Shae, as well as a son, Kyler. Simmons frequently describes himself as a devout Christian.

In the summer of 2009, Simmons played in the USSSA U15 Florida state basketball championship game in Gainesville against the Jupiter Jaguars, a team that featured Tyler Cameron, future football player at Wake Forest and Florida Atlantic and member of season 15 of ABC's The Bachelorette as well as Kedric Bostic, future Quarterback at Princeton University, among others.

References

External links
 Boston College Eagles bio
 Denver Broncos bio

1993 births
Living people
African-American players of American football
American Conference Pro Bowl players
American football cornerbacks
American football safeties
Boston College Eagles football players
Denver Broncos players
Martin County High School alumni
People from Manassas, Virginia
People from Stuart, Florida
Players of American football from Florida
Players of American football from Virginia